Corey Jackson (born July 16, 2006), better known by his stage name Corey J. or Lil C-Note, is an American rapper and motivational speaker. He is the protégé of Young Thug and Birdman and is currently signed to Fast Life Entertainment. He is best known for his songs "Crank It", "Call'em Crayons" and "Me and My Daddy" as well as for his "If I Can Do It, You Can To" foundation.

Life and career
Born in Jackson, Mississippi, Jackson began showing signs of his talent by the age of 2 while breakdancing to his father's records. At age 4, while going over colors with his father, he told him that he had written a song, namely "Call'em Crayons". After two years of practice and rehearsals, Jackson released his first single at the age of 6. The single was well received and was followed up with successful singles "Crank It", "Me and My Daddy" and "Bank Close" as well as a nationwide tour including performances at Essence Music Festival in New Orleans and Go Figure Music Festival in Dallas, Texas, earning him awards such as the 'Black Celebrity giving award' and the 'Best Kid artist of the Year' award.

At age 10, Jackson started the "If I Can Do It, You Can To" foundation, with which he toured to give motivational speeches to children in auditoriums, while also making appearances on CNN and The Ellen DeGeneres Show. Since 2013, he helped feed families for Thanksgiving and given out large donations of toys to disenfranchised children. Jackson mentions his father Chase as his biggest influence as well as the positive people around him.

Discography

Singles
 Skate (Fast Life Entertainment) (2013)
 Call'em Crayons (Fast Life Entertainment) (2013)
 Me and My Daddy (featuring Chase) (Fast Life Entertainment) (2013)
 Bank Close (Fast Life Entertainment) (2013)
 Real 20's (Fast Life Entertainment) (2016)

Mixtapes
 Crank It Up In Here Volume 1 - (Fast Life Entertainment) (2014)
 Make My Music Work For Me - Corey J. aka Lil C-Note and Noo Noo (Fast Life Entertainment) (2016)

References

2006 births
Living people
21st-century American male actors
African-American crunk musicians
African-American male rappers
African-American record producers
American hip hop record producers
Rappers from Mississippi
Musicians from Jackson, Mississippi
Southern hip hop musicians
Businesspeople from Jackson, Mississippi
21st-century American rappers
21st-century American male musicians
21st-century African-American musicians